Agonum lugens is a species of ground beetle in the Platyninae subfamily. It was described by Caspar Erasmus Duftschmid in 1812.

Description
The upper body is black, male and female both have lightly shiny mat. The elytron usually have three pores, which have strongly curved main edge.

Ecology
They live on wet clay soil.

References

Beetles described in 1812
lugens